Spaceplex was an indoor amusement park and arcade opened in 1991 at 620 Middle Country Road, Nesconset, New York, United States. Gary Tuzzalo was a co-owner and the general manager, and James Manas was another principal in the parent company, Spaceplex Amusement Centers International Ltd. It is the location where Katie Beers' abductor, John Esposito, claimed to have lost Beers, when in reality she was not taken from there.

A 1993 article in The New York Times Magazine described it as a quintessentially Long Island landmark, with the writer using the fabric satin as a metaphor:

The stock of Spaceplex Amusement Centers International Ltd. was among those of seven companies that were manipulated in a fraud scheme by a group of 58 brokers and brokerages charged by the Securities and Exchange Commission in December 1997. The SEC sued 63 individuals and entities in 2000 in related proceedings. Manas pleaded guilty and cooperated with the government's investigation.

Spaceplex filed for Chapter 11 bankruptcy protection on April 16, 1996.

The building that housed Spaceplex later became the site of an indoor sports arena.

It is unrelated to General Dynamics' SpacePlex research facility in New Mexico, US.

References

Defunct amusement parks in New York (state)
Smithtown, New York
Companies that filed for Chapter 11 bankruptcy in 1996
1991 establishments in New York (state)
Outer space in amusement parks